The New Zealand bittern (Ixobrychus novaezelandiae) is an extinct and enigmatic species of heron in the family Ardeidae.  It was endemic to New Zealand and was last recorded alive in the 1890s.

Common names for this species include New Zealand little bittern, spotted heron, and kaoriki (Māori).  The scientific species name also has numerous junior synonyms.

Taxonomy
The species has sometimes been regarded as a subspecies of little bittern (Ixobrychus minutus), or conspecific with the black-backed bittern (Ixobrychus dubius) of Australia and New Guinea, though it was first described by Alexander Callender Purdie in 1871 as Ardeola novaezelandiae. In 1980, New Zealand palaeontologist Peter L. Horn found subfossil bones of a bittern from Lake Poukawa, which he named Dupetor flavicollis. In 1991, Philip Millener identified Horn's material as remains of the New Zealand bittern.

Description
Although a small bittern, the species was larger (length about 14.75 inches (38 cm)) than the little bittern (25–36 cm).  Few specimens are known, and of these  doubt exists even about the sex of some, making published descriptions unreliable.  Differences from the little bittern include a larger buff patch on the upper wing, black upper parts streaked light brown, under parts streaked dark brown and rufous-buff.

Distribution and habitat
In recent times, the bird is only known with certainty to have inhabited the South Island of New Zealand, with most records from Westland.  Although subfossil remains have been found in the North Island, reports of living birds may have been of misidentified Australasian bitterns.  The first scientific specimen was reportedly obtained at Tauranga in the North Island by the Reverend Mr Stack in 1836, but is now untraceable.  The holotype specimen in the Museum of New Zealand was taken from the head of Lake Wakatipu in Otago.  The recorded habitat for the species includes the wooded margins of saline lagoons and creeks.

Behaviour
Walter Buller quotes a Mr Docherty, who was familiar with the bird in Westland:
They are to be found on the salt-water lagoons on the seashore, always hugging the timbered side of the same. I have seen them in two positions, viz.:— standing on the bank of the lagoon, with their heads bent forward, studiously watching the water; at other times I have seen them standing straight up, almost perpendicular; I should say this is the proper position for the bird to be placed in when stuffed. When speaking of lagoons as the places where they are to be found, I may mention that I caught one about two miles in the bush, on the bank of a creek; but the creek led to a lagoon. They live on small fishes or the roots of reeds; I should say the latter, because at the very place where I caught one I observed the reeds turned up and the roots gone. They are very solitary, and always found alone, and they stand for hours in one place. I heard a person say that he had opened one and found a large egg in it. They breed on the ground in very obscure places; I never heard their cry.

Feeding
The bittern is recorded as eating mudfish and worms in captivity, when given in water.

Voice
Two calls were recorded by Buller, a "peculiar snapping cry" as an alarm call, and a "cry not unlike that of a kingfisher, though not so loud".

References

External links
Holotype from the collection of the Museum of New Zealand Te Papa Tongarewa
New Zealand Little Bittern / Kaoriki. Ixobrychus novaezelandiae. by Paul Martinson. Artwork produced for the book Extinct Birds of New Zealand by Alan Tennyson, Te Papa Press, Wellington, 2006 

Ixobrychus
Bitterns
Bird extinctions since 1500
Extinct birds of New Zealand
Birds described in 1871
Taxonomy articles created by Polbot